Antonio Pascale (born 8 July 1977) is a retired Italian football striker.

References

1977 births
Living people
Italian footballers
FC Sion players
FC Locarno players
SC Kriens players
FC Schaffhausen players
SR Delémont players
Association football forwards
Swiss Super League players
Italian expatriate footballers
Expatriate footballers in Scotland
Italian expatriate sportspeople in Scotland